Noble Consort Xin (26 June 1737 – 28 May 1764), of the Manchu Bordered Yellow Banner Daigiya clan, was a consort of the Qianlong Emperor. She was 26 years his junior.

Life

Family background
Noble Consort Xin's personal name was not recorded in history.

 Father: Nasutu (d. 1749), served as the Minister of War from 1736–1737, the Minister of Justice in 1737 and 1740, the Viceroy of Liangjiang from 1737–1739 and from 1741–1742 and the Viceroy of Liangguang from 1744–1745
 Paternal grandfather: Daochan (道禅), served as superior censor (长史, pinyin: zhangshi)
 Great-great aunt: Consort Cheng, Kangxi Emperor's consort
Mother: Lady Janggiya (章佳氏)
Maternal grandfather: Derui (德瑞)
Maternal great-great aunt: Imperial Noble Consort Jingmin, Kangxi Emperor's consort
Three sisters:
First elder sister (b.1707): wife of deputy governor of Jiangsu You Anning (尤安宁)
Second elder sister: wife of fourth rank literary official Qichengge (期成额) of the Wanyan clan
Third elder sister: wife of the secretary of the Inner Court Fulongga (福隆阿) of the Niohuru clan.

Qianlong era
The future Noble Consort Xin was born on the 29th day of the fifth lunar month in the second year of the reign of the Qianlong Emperor, which translates to 26 June 1737 in the Gregorian calendar.

It is not known when Lady Daigiya entered the Forbidden City and became a mistress of the Qianlong Emperor. In May or June 1754, she was granted the title "Concubine Xin". She gave birth on 24 August 1755 to the emperor's sixth daughter, who would die prematurely on 27 September 1758, and on 16 January 1758 to his eighth daughter, who would die prematurely on 17 June 1767. On 16 October 1763, she was elevated to "Consort Xin".

Lady Daigiya died in childbirth on 28 May 1764 and was posthumously elevated to "Noble Consort Xin" and given a funeral befitting a Noble Consort. In 1765, she was interred in the Yu Mausoleum of the Eastern Qing tombs.

Titles
 During the reign of the Qianlong Emperor (r. 1735–1796):
 Lady Daigiya (from 26 June 1737)
 Concubine Xin (from May/June 1754), fifth rank consort
 Consort Xin (from 16 October 1763), fourth rank consort
 Noble Consort Xin (from 22 March 1765), third rank consort

Issue
 As Concubine Xin:
 The Qianlong Emperor's sixth daughter (24 August 1755 – 27 September 1758)
 The Qianlong Emperor's eighth daughter (16 January 1758 – 17 June 1767)
 As Consort Xin:
 Obstructed labour or miscarriage at eight months (28 May 1764)

See also
 Ranks of imperial consorts in China#Qing
 Royal and noble ranks of the Qing dynasty

Notes

References
 

1737 births
1764 deaths
Consorts of the Qianlong Emperor
Manchu people
Deaths in childbirth